Brachyolus is a genus of broad-nosed weevil in the family Curculionidae.

Species 
Species accepted within the genus Brachyolus:

 Brachyolus bagooides Sharp, 1886
 Brachyolus bicostatus Broun, 1914
 Brachyolus huttoni Sharp, 1886
 Brachyolus labeculatus Broun, 1913
 Brachyolus longicollis Sharp, 1886
 Brachyolus nodirostris Broun, 1921
 Brachyolus obscurus Broun, 1921
 Brachyolus punctatus White, 1846
 Brachyolus varius Broun, 1913

References 

Brachycerinae
Beetles described in 1846